is a Japanese method of displaying all the names of the members in a group by collecting the names on individual plaques called  and hanging them together in a specialized case called . Nafudakake can be found in traditional art forms such as chadō, in modern art forms such as judo, at Shinto shrines (where they are used to display the names of benefactors) and in some modern organizations such as volunteer fire departments.  In English, the term is most commonly associated with Japanese martial arts, and nafudakake are commonly considered an element of a traditional martial arts dojo.

Nafuda

Nafuda are thin, rectangular wooden plaques on which individuals’ names are written vertically in kanji or kana or horizontally in Latin script.  The plaques are usually made from a light wood such as pine and hand-painted.  The back of the plaque may contain information about the person's history in the dojo.

The term "nafuda" should not be confused with the identification worn on the tare of kendo armor, for which the same word can be used.

Purpose and use of nafuda

Nafuda are used for different purposes in different dojos.  In some dojos, nafuda are arranged according to rank, and a person's nafuda is moved upon attaining a higher rank, although other dojos display only the nafuda of yudansha but not those of mudansha. In some dojos, nafuda are used to track attendance and in others a member's nafuda is removed for failure to pay dojo fees on time.  In some dojos, only the nafuda of currently active members are displayed, while in others the nafuda of past members who have moved away or died are displayed as a kind of memorial.  Some dojos display the nafuda of foreign affiliates of the dojo, but do so separately from active members of the dojo.  Some dojos display the adult and child nafuda separately.  In yet other dojos, everyone who has received a dan grade from the dojo is listed as yudansha on the nafudakake.  The nafudakake can be used to display the names of the dojo's lineage and style's founders. In the Seattle Dojo, which is the oldest judo dojo in the United States, displayed nafuda from early members help maintain the historical memory of the dojo.

Design and placement of nafudakake

There is no standardized design for nafudakake.  The nafuda may be hung from small hooks on the kake or held in place by wooden trusses.
The nafudakake may be placed in the shimoza (cosmological "south"—often the actual south wall) of a dojo, although it may also be located in other places such as the shimoseki (cosmological "west"), which in Daoist thought is representative of rectitude, or the proper relationship between members of the dojo.  The joseki (cosmological "east") may also be used, and if the arts of more than one  are taught in the same dojo, separate nafudakake for both schools may be displayed.

The arrangement of the nafuda on the kake may be very different from one dojo to another.  Although Chinese characters are traditionally read vertically and in columns from right to left, some dojos place their senior member in the upper left portion of their nafudakake.

The following example of a nafudakake is hanging on the west wall (shimoseki) of a Japanese aikido dojo. The dojo displays one nafudakake for instructors and a separate one for yudansha.  In this example, the nafuda should be read right-to-left as follows:

In addition to the terminology presented in this example, nafudakake may designate sensei (teacher), senpai (senior student), or any of a number of other positions recognized in martial arts dojos.

External links
 Daniel Rodríguez Valero. "La distribución de un Dojo" Aikido Alicante [Spanish]: blog post describing the nafuda at Kumanojuku (includes photographs)
images of nafudakake
 Photograph of nafuda being hand-painted
 Check-paid marker at a traditional Japanese restaurant that looks similar to a nafuda
 Photograph of the Nomo Dojo (kendo): nafudakake can be seen in the shimoseki, to the left of someone facing the dojo's shomen (i.e., probably the west wall of the dojo)
 Photograph of Yoshinkan hombu dojo with nafudakake in background
 Photographs of Seattle Dojo's nafudakake: nafuda from the oldest judo dojo in the United States: also available on Flickr
 Photograph of old nafudakake in the home of Shimizu no Jirocho; see also Ninkyō Shimizu-minato
 Photograph of nafudakake in which names painted on both sides of the nafuda are used to track attendance at a workplace
 Photograph of Aikido Center of Jacksonville's nafudakake: senior member in upper left corner.
 Photograph of Aoi Koyamakan Dojo
 Photograph of an Okinawan karate dojo's nafudakake: from its website
 Photograph of white oak nafuda with walnut kake from Shelby Shotokan Karate
 Photograph of nafuda that combine Japanese characters with Latin script read in a different plane from an Italian aikido dojo
 Commercial website showing a variety of different styles of nafudakake available for purchase
virtual nafudakake
Some martial arts dojos have begun putting "virtual nafudakake" on their websites.  In some cases, a simple list of dojo members is called a "nafudakake", but some dojos have used CGI for their nafudakake.  The following is a list of examples of "virtual nafudakake":
 Example of virtual nafuda of a martial arts instructor and Directory of virtual nafuda
 Aikido of Pamplona website
 Tomodachi Judo Club
 Water Oak Aikikai
 Karate Taiyokan

References

Japanese martial arts terminology
Japanese culture